The Alaska-Alberta Railway Development Corporation (also known as A2A for Alaska to Alberta) was an entity created to build, own, and operate a proposed  railroad between Delta Junction, Alaska, and Fort McMurray, Alberta. In 2021, the company was put in receivership and the project was on hold due to financial irregularities between the A2A president and main financial backer Bridging Finance.

The railroad was planned to interchange with and operate on part of the Alaska Railroad, in order to access Southcentral Alaska and its ports.  the project was estimated to cost CA$20 billion. A rival enterprise, G7G Railway, estimated in 2020 the capital cost to be just under US$20 billion. They proposed shipping oil, via the Trans-Alaska Pipeline, from rail cars in Delta Junction to the coast.

Route

The proposed A2A railway would have connected to the Alaska Railroad at Delta Junction, Alaska, and run through the Yukon to Fort Nelson, British Columbia, and from there to a terminus at Fort McMurray, Alberta. The A2A Railway had also been negotiating with the Mat-Su Borough on an agreement to complete the Port Mackenzie Railway Extension.

Planning and construction 
The Van Horne Institute studied the route in 2013. A survey of the proposed route by the development corporation began in July 2020.

On September 25, 2020, US President Donald Trump announced he would issue a presidential permit to the railway, which had an agreement with Alaska Railway to develop a joint operating plan for the rail connection to Canada.

A2A announced that JP Gladu was joining as President of A2A Rail Canada. In July 2020, the company expected to start early field activities and detailed engineering design by Q1 2021. However, there is no evidence of substantive field work being undertaken.

Creditor protection
In 2021, the Ontario Securities Commission (OSC) began investigating irregularities in the business dealings between the main financier of the A2A project, Bridging Finance Inc., and A2A's president, Sean McCoshen. The OSC alleges that following the funding of loans to various McCoshen companies, McCoshen funnelled a total of $19.5 million to Bridging's CEO David Sharpe. Additionally, the OSC also alleges that "millions of dollars pledged for A2A rail also went to McCoshen's personal bank account and to an apparently unrelated company controlled by him."

With the investigation underway, Bridging Finance was placed under receivership in April 2021.  Bridging's receiver, PricewaterhouseCoopers requested repayment of A2A's $149 million loan in early June 2021.  A2A did not have the funds available to repay the loan and it filed for creditor protection in June 2021.  McCoshen no longer appearing on the A2A website as an officer of the company. 

Work on the project is on hold until new financing can be found, with the project in danger of being abandoned.

See also
Canada–Alaska Railway — early concepts for similar routes
Rail transport in Canada
Rail transportation in the United States

References

Proposed railway lines in Canada
Proposed railway lines in Alaska
Alaska railroads
Alberta railways
Northwest Territories railways
Yukon railways
International railway lines
Canada–United States border crossings
Rail freight companies
Petroleum transport
Canada–United States trade relations